El Paisano Ranch is located in Jim Wells County, Texas, United States.  It is one of the oldest working ranches in Texas, operating since 1835, which was ten years before Texas gained statehood in the Union.  In November 2014, it was recognized by the Texas Agriculture Commission as a ranch that had been in continuous agriculture production for more than 150 years at the Texas State Capital.  El Paisano was originally granted to Ramon de la Garza on March 25, 1830 by the Mexican State of Tamaulipas as The Paisano Grant.  The original plot was 11070 acres, with 6184 acres in Jim Wells County, 3456 acres in Kleberg County, and 1430 acres in Brooks County.

Though Garza was granted the land in 1830 and had livestock on it, he was not given ownership until he petitioned the local City Council in July 1835 to secure the title for El Paisano.  The acting Minister of Treasury of Public Finance of Tamaulipas, José Núñez de Cáceres, certified that Jose Antonio Velasquez deposited 25 pesos for Ramon Garza for the official purchase of The Paisano Grant in late 1835.  A ceremony recognizing the possession being given to Garza was held on April 21, 1836.

References

External links
 

Ranches in Texas
1835 establishments in Texas
American companies established in 1834